Paola Suárez was the defending champion of the 2005 Canberra International but did not join the tournament on that year. Ana Ivanovic, a qualifier here won in the final 7–5, 6–1, against Lucky loser Melinda Czink. It was her first ever WTA title and it was achieved just before she made her Grand Slam début at the 2005 Australian Open.

Ana Ivanovic and Melinda Czink also met in the finals of the qualifying draw here with Ivanovic prevailing 6–1, 6–3.
This was the first time two players played each other twice in two finals at a tournament. Ivanovic and Czink battled each other at the Qualifying finals and the Main Draw finals, with Ivanovic winning both times.

Seeds

Draw

Finals

Top half

Bottom half

Qualifying

Seeds

Qualifiers

Qualifying draw

First qualifier

Second qualifier

Third qualifier

Fourth qualifier

References

External links
Main and Qualifying Draws on ITF

Singles